Anthony Obodai (born 6 August 1982) is a Ghanaian former professional footballer who played as a midfielder.

Career

Club career
Born in Accra, Obodai began his career with local team Liberty Professionals in 2000. He signed for Dutch team Ajax in 2001, playing on loan at Belgian side Germinal Beerschot during the 2002–03 season. In August 2005 a move to English side Luton Town collapsed, and Obodai moved to Sparta Rotterdam two days later. Obodai was made club captain at Sparta, but asked to leave the club in January 2007, signing for RKC Waalwijk on 31 January 2007. During his time in the Netherlands and Belgium, Obodai made nearly 200 appearances.

Obodai was signed by Houston Dynamo of Major League Soccer in July 2010, making four appearances before being released at the end of the season.

In January 2012 he signed a contract at Birinci Lig side Mağusa Türk Gücü in Northern Cyprus.

In February 2013, Obodai signed for Phoenix FC of the USL Pro, the third division of the United States soccer pyramid.   In his first season with the club, Obodai made 24 appearances and tallied one assist. When Phoenix FC faced financial difficulty after its first season of existence, Obodai signed for the Pittsburgh Riverhounds, also of the USL Pro, on 7 November 2013.

In January 2015 he signed with Ånge in the Swedish Division 2. He left the club after the season.

International career
Obodai played at the 1999 FIFA U-17 World Championship and the 2001 FIFA World Youth Championship. He also earned four senior caps for Ghana between 2003 and 2005.

References

1982 births
Living people
Footballers from Accra
Ghanaian footballers
Association football midfielders
Liberty Professionals F.C. players
AFC Ajax players
Beerschot A.C. players
Sparta Rotterdam players
RKC Waalwijk players
Houston Dynamo FC players
Phoenix FC players
Pittsburgh Riverhounds SC players
Ånge IF players
Eredivisie players
Belgian Pro League players
Eerste Divisie players
Major League Soccer players
USL Championship players
Ghana international footballers
Ghana under-20 international footballers
Ghanaian expatriate footballers
Expatriate footballers in the Netherlands
Ghanaian expatriate sportspeople in the Netherlands
Expatriate footballers in Belgium
Ghanaian expatriate sportspeople in Belgium
Expatriate soccer players in the United States
Ghanaian expatriate sportspeople in the United States
Expatriate footballers in Sweden
Ghanaian expatriate sportspeople in Sweden
Expatriate footballers in Northern Cyprus
Ghanaian expatriate sportspeople in Northern Cyprus